Musa ibn Faris al-Mutawakkil (Musa ibn Faris Abu Faris al-Mutawakkil) was Marinid Sultan of Morocco from 1384 to 1386.

Life 
Musa ibn Faris replaced the Sultan Abu'l-Abbas Ahmad al-Mustansir in 1384.
His accession was engineered by the Nasrid dynasty of the Emirate of Granada.  
Musa ibn Faris was a disabled son of the former Sultan Abu Inan Faris.
Musa Ben Faris ruled until 1386.
He was replaced by Muhammad ibn Ahmad Abu Zayyan al-Wathiq, who ruled until 1387.
Abul Abbas then regained the throne.

References
Citations

Sources

People from Fez, Morocco
Marinid sultans of Morocco
14th-century Berber people
14th-century Moroccan people
14th-century monarchs in Africa